This list of museums in Staffordshire, England contains museums which are defined for this context as institutions (including nonprofit organizations, government entities, and private businesses) that collect and care for objects of cultural, artistic, scientific, or historical interest and make their collections or related exhibits available for public viewing. Also included are non-profit art galleries and university art galleries.  Museums that exist only in cyberspace (i.e., virtual museums) are not included.

Defunct museums
 Ceramica, Burslem, closed in 2011
 Coors Visitor Centre, collections now part of the National Brewery Centre, Burton upon Trent

See also
:Category:Tourist attractions in Staffordshire

 
Staffordshire
Museums